Lady Mary Tufton (6 July 170119 February 1785) was an English aristocrat and philanthropist.

She was the youngest child of Thomas Tufton, 6th Earl of Thanet, a politician, who was himself noted for his charitable giving. She was named in her father's will as an executor and administrator of the trust he established to provide for charities, including a school for poor children.

She married Anthony Grey, Earl of Harold, on 17 February 1718. Grey died at the age of 27 by choking on an ear of barley, on 21 July 1723.

She was one of the group of aristocratic women who signed Thomas Coram's petition to King George II to establish the Foundling Hospital, a place of safety for babies and children at risk of abandonment. She signed on 6 November 1733. She joined the group in supporting an increase in systematised social welfare initiatives. In an essay which celebrates the role of women in the history of the Foundling Hospital, Elizabeth Einberg states that the women not only lent it their social cachet, but could 'highlight the Christian, virtuous and humanitarian aspects of such an endeavour', making it 'one of the most fashionable charities of the day'.

Her father's will had stipulated that, if she remarried, she would cease being an executor of his trust and charities. However, at the time of her marriage to John Leveson-Gower, 1st Earl Gower on 16 May 1736, she was the only surviving executor. She petitioned for, and was granted, letters of administration that enabled her to continue in that role. She provided financial support to other charities, including almshouses in Vauxhall for seven poor widows, which she had repaired and for which she purchased shares to provide them with an ongoing income, and a school for poor children in Brighton, Sussex (or Brighthelmston, as it was known in 1771). One hundred and forty years after her death, these charities were still known as 'the Countess of Gower's Charity'. She also provided additional income for clergy livings at several churches in Lancashire and Cumbria, for which she was remembered as "that great friend of poor livings".

At the news of her marriage to Leveson-Gower, a contemporary commented 'everybody thinks him a lucky man to get a woman of her understanding and fortune [...] but love removes great obstacles.' At the time her jointure from her first marriage was £2000, a significant fortune.

By her marriage to Leveson-Gower, she had two children, the younger of whom was Rear-Admiral John Leveson-Gower. She died on 19 February 1785, at the age of 83.

Styles
 Lady Mary Tufton
 Countess of Harold
 Baroness Lucas of Crudwell
 Baroness Gower of Sittenham
 Countess Gower

Ancestry

References 

English philanthropists
Thanet
Harold
Gower
Daughters of British earls
1701 births
1785 deaths